Steven Dubois (born May 1, 1997) is a Canadian short-track speed skater.

Career

Junior
At the 2016 World Junior Short Track Speed Skating Championships in Sofia. Bulgaria, Dubois won the bronze medal in the 500 m event.

Senior
Dubois joined Canada's World Cup team for the first time in 2017 and was a reserve for the 2018 Winter Olympics. His first full season as part of the World Cup team was in the 2018–19 season, winning bronze in three of the World Cup stops in the 1500 m event.

The following season, Dubois would win his first individual World Cup race, the 500 m event in Dresden, among a silver and two bronze individual (versus team) medals he won at other stops during the season.

At the 2020 Four Continents Short Track Speed Skating Championships, the first edition of the event, Dubois won silver in all five events (500 m, 1000m, 1500 m, 5000 m relay and overall).

At the 2021 Canadian Short Track Speed Skating Championships, Dubois took top place.

On January 18, 2022, Dubois was named to Canada's 2022 Olympic team. At the Olympics, Dubois won the silver medal in the 1,500 metres event. Dubois followed up his silver medal win with a bronze medal in the 500 metres event. Dubois finished his Olympics with a gold medal win as part of Canada's team in the 5000 m relay event.

References

External links

1997 births
Living people
French Quebecers
Canadian male short track speed skaters
Four Continents Short Track Speed Skating Championships medalists
Sportspeople from Laval, Quebec
Short track speed skaters at the 2022 Winter Olympics
Olympic short track speed skaters of Canada
Medalists at the 2022 Winter Olympics
Olympic medalists in short track speed skating
Olympic silver medalists for Canada
Olympic bronze medalists for Canada
Olympic gold medalists for Canada
World Short Track Speed Skating Championships medalists